Elections to North Tyneside Metropolitan Council took place on 1 May 2003 on the same day as other local council elections in England.

North Tyneside Council is elected "in thirds" which means one councilor from each three-member ward is elected each year with a third year when the mayoral election takes place.

There was also a mayoral by-election held, which was won by Linda Arkley of the Conservative Party, after Chris Morgan was forced to resign due to allegations of possessing indecent images of children on his computer. He was subsequently cleared of all charges.

Mayoral by-election

Battle Hill

Benton

Camperdown

Chirton

Collingwood

Cullercoats

Holystone

Howdon

Longbenton

Monkseaton

North Shields

Northumberland

Riverside

Seatonville

St Mary's

Tynemouth

A further by-election was held on 14 August 2003. Details of this can be found here.

Valley

Wallsend

Weetslade

Whitley Bay

References

North Tyneside Council website  Elections 2003
North Tyneside Council website Mayoral election 2003
BBC North Tyneside election 2003
Full 2003 North Tyneside election results

2003
2003 English local elections
21st century in Tyne and Wear